Bryn Nelson Smith (born August 11, 1955) is an American former professional baseball player who was a pitcher in Major League Baseball (MLB) from 1981 to 1993.

Selected in the 49th round in 1973 as the 779th player, Smith made his Major League debut with the Montreal Expos after being acquired along with Rudy May and Randy Miller from the Baltimore Orioles for Don Stanhouse, Joe Kerrigan and Gary Roenicke at the Winter Meetings on December 7, 1977. He had a pair of 5-game winning streaks in 1985 and was picked Expo Player of the Month for July by Montreal baseball writers after a 3-1 record and 1.74 ERA. In 1989 he became a subject of teasing when he complained in a Sports Illustrated article about the playing conditions in Montreal, which included the inconvenience of having to drive to Plattsburgh, New York, to buy Dorito chips.  Smith was the first winning pitcher in Colorado Rockies history, defeating Montreal, 11-4, on April 9, 1993. He is also the oldest living former Rockie player.

Personal life
Smith attended Allan Hancock College in Santa Maria, California, where he was an All Western Conference Selection. He takes his first name from the initials of his grandfather, Baxter Robert Young Nisbet.

Smith is the pitching coach for the Santa Maria Packers of the Pacific West Baseball League. He also helped start the team.

References

External links

Baseball Almanac

1955 births
Living people
Sportspeople from Santa Maria, California
Baseball players from Georgia (U.S. state)
American expatriate baseball players in Canada
Major League Baseball pitchers
Allan Hancock Bulldogs baseball players
Montreal Expos players
St. Louis Cardinals players
Colorado Rockies players
Miami Orioles players
Charlotte O's players
Memphis Chicks players
Denver Bears players
Wichita Aeros players
Louisville Redbirds players